Tito is a 2019 Canadian drama film written and directed by Grace Glowicki. Glowicki plays a man terrified of the outside world and hunted by sexual predators. The refuge he finds in an abandoned house is disturbed by the arrival of a cheerful and protective neighbor.

The film premiered at the 2019 South by Southwest Film Festival, where it won the Adam Yauch Hörnblowér Award. It also won the first Audacity Award at the 2019 Oldenburg International Film Festival.

The film was shortlisted for the John Dunning Best First Feature Award at the 9th Canadian Screen Awards in 2021.

Critical response
The New Yorker's Richard Brody called it "the most remarkable feature that I saw at the Maryland festival."

Production 
On August 16, 2018 a post-production Kickstarter campaign was launched with a fundraising target of $18,000. Funding closed with $23,027 pledged by 121 backers.

References

External links
 
 

2019 films
Canadian drama films
English-language Canadian films
2010s English-language films
2010s Canadian films